José Romeiro Cardoso Neto (3 July 1933 – 4 January 2008) known simply as Romeiro, was a Brazilian professional footballer who played as a winger for Palmeiras.

Honours
  Palmeiras
 Campeonato Paulista: 1959
 Taça Brasil (Campeonato Brasileiro Série A): 1960

References

External links

Brazilian footballers
2008 deaths
1933 births
Association football wingers
Sociedade Esportiva Palmeiras players
Brazil international footballers